Group 1 of the 1978 FIFA World Cup was one of four groups of nations competing at the 1978 FIFA World Cup. The group's first round of matches began on 2 June and its last matches were played on 10 June. All six group matches were played either at Estadio José María Minella in Mar del Plata, or Estadio Monumental in Buenos Aires. The group consisted of Argentina (the host of the tournament) as well as Italy, France and Hungary.

Standings

Matches

Italy vs France
The first game in Group 1 pitted Italy against France. Italy were favored to win but had been victims of plenty of dull and unexciting performances leading up, while a rejuvenated French team were making their first appearance since the 1966 world cup. The first goal came with under a minute as goalkeeper Bertrand-Demanes passed the ball to Didier Six who ran down the entire length of the pitch before delivering a good cross that Bernard Lacombe headed past Dino Zoff to score the first goal of the tournament. Italy controlled the rest of the match and equalized halfway through the first half when after the ball pinged around the area it glanced off the unsuspecting Paolo Rossi and into the goal. It would be the first of 9 goals Rossi would score at the finals. Shortly after the beginning of the second-half substitute Renato Zaccarelli's shot went in. The Italians saw out the rest of the match, which saw little chances except for Maxime Bossis's shot that flew just wide of Zoff's post. Despite it being an unremarkable match it featured the emergence of two teams that would dazzle the world four years later at the 1982 FIFA World Cup.

Argentina vs Hungary

Italy vs Hungary
Italy once again had an uncertain start against Hungary in their second group game and appeared nervy early on, and Hungary had several good chances to score. But just after the half-hour mark Paolo Rossi made it two goals in two games by firing home after a shot had deflected into his path. Just a minute later Roberto Bettega took advantage of some poor defending to make it two goals in two minutes. Midway through the second half Romeo Benetti fired in a superb shot and Italy had the victory all but secure. It could have been so much more as the Italians hit the crossbar a total of three times in the game. Late on Hungary won a penalty kick, which was dispatched by substitute András Tóth but it was just consolation as Hungary were eliminated and Italy confirmed their spot in the second round.

Argentina vs France

France vs Hungary
Both teams arrived for the match with white shirts and France was forced to borrow green-striped shirts from local club Kimberley de Mar del Plata.

Argentina vs Italy

References

1978 FIFA World Cup
France at the 1978 FIFA World Cup
Italy at the 1978 FIFA World Cup
Argentina at the 1978 FIFA World Cup
Hungary at the 1978 FIFA World Cup
FIFA World Cup 1978